The City of Edinburgh Music School is a state-maintained music school in Scotland in Edinburgh, Scotland. Founded as the Lothian Specialist Music School in 1980, it changed its name in 1996 when Lothian Regional Council was dissolved into four separate unitary councils. It is a non-residential school, and because it is funded by the City of Edinburgh Council, it charges no fees. Unlike some standalone music schools, pupils attend comprehensive schools for majority of their academic classes: Flora Stevenson Primary and Broughton High School.

The school was the subject of BBC Scotland's EX:S documentary, The Music School, on 29 March 2005.

Notable alumni
Martyn Bennett, bagpiper
Helen Grime, composer
Tommy Smith (saxophonist)

See also
 Music Schools in Scotland
 List of music schools in the United Kingdom

References

External links
Official site

Primary schools in Edinburgh
Secondary schools in Edinburgh
Culture in Edinburgh
1980 establishments in Scotland
Educational institutions established in 1980
Music schools in Scotland